The Spanish Fury at Mechelen was an event in the Eighty Years' War on October 2, 1572 in which the city of Mechelen was conquered by the Spanish army and brutally sacked.

Prelude 

In spring and summer 1572, many cities in the Low Countries came under control of William of Orange, some actively supporting the rebels, other taking a more cautious attitude. Mechelen had opened its gates to the troops of William on August 31. William continued his advance towards Mons, but left a garrison in Mechelen under command of Bernard van Merode.

On September 21, William was forced by a large Spanish army under the Duke of Alba to withdraw to Holland. The Duke of Alba now wanted to retake all cities in the south and decided to make an example of one of them. He ordered his son Fadrique Álvarez de Toledo to punish Mechelen for tolerating a rebel garrison. Plundering this rich city would also quiet his troops, which had not received any pay in a long time.

The sack of Mechelen 

When Bernard de Merode heard that a much stronger Spanish force was approaching Mechelen, he and his men left the city. The mainly Catholic people of Mechelen welcomed the Spanish by singing psalms of penitence in a gesture of surrender. Despite this, Fadrique Álvarez de Toledo unleashed his troops upon the city for three days of slaughter, rape and pillaging. Alba reported to King Philip II (who later imprisoned him) afterwards that "no nail was left in the wall".<ref
 name=SEE-BIBLIOGRAPHY_AR-sub2>
 Arnade (2008) p. 226–229.
</ref>

In his Histories of the United Netherlands (1728), Protestant theologian and historian Jean Leclerc wrote the following account:

Aftermath 
In the short term, the sack of Mechelen had the desired effect. All cities in Alba's path surrendered without resistance. The next example would be set in the Spanish Fury at Zutphen on November 15.

It is important to distinguish the so-called "Spanish Furies" in 1572 from the Spanish Fury at Antwerp in 1576, as these were explicitly ordered by the military commanders, while the sack of Antwerp was perpetrated by mutinous troops.

References 

Battles of the Eighty Years' War
Mechelen
Massacres in Belgium
1572 in the Habsburg Netherlands
Conflicts in 1572
Eighty Years' War (1566–1609)
Looting
History of Mechelen
Spanish war crimes